The redistricting of United States congressional districts is made by the legislatures of the states every 10 years, immediately following the official announcement of the federal census that serves as the basis of the apportionment.  It was long the practice that the apportionment thus made stood until after the next decennial census.

However, the power rests with the legislature to change or adjust the apportionment during the interim and in 1845, the tradition in Ohio of reapportioning following the decennial census was broken.  For the last half of the century, it was the policy of the party in power in the legislature to secure the largest amount of political advantage in making the apportionments, and they were made whenever the political control of the assembly changed.  From 1878 to 1892, the state was reapportioned six times as power oscillated between the two parties.

A partisan majority in the legislature has it in their power to so apportion the districts as to enable the minority of the voters in the state to elect a majority of the congressional delegation, or to empower a bare majority of the voters to elect almost the entire delegation, in effect disenfranchising the minority. No apportionment of Ohio was absolutely free from partisan bias.

Constitutional background

Ohio’s legislative structure
Under the original Ohio constitution, state representatives were chosen annually for the term of one year, and state senators were chosen for two years, the original allotment being such that half the senators held over and one-half of the body was chosen at the annual elections, necessitating annual sessions of the legislature.

The mode of electing members of the Ohio General Assembly was changed under the constitution of 1851. Senators and representatives were elected biennially, for the term of two years, and the entire legislature changed its membership at the end of the biennial period.

The object of the change in the organic law was to obviate annual legislative sessions, but as a rule, up to the last decade of the century, annual sessions were held, the general assembly adjourning to a date in the second year of the biennial period to complete its unfinished business and consider other legislative matters.

Other changes were proposed in the Ohio Constitutional Convention of 1872–73.  However, the citizens soundly rejected the proposed changes in the referendum in 1874.  The next change in the state constitution did not occur until the 20th century.

Ohio’s county structure
At the time of the first apportionment in 1812, there were 40 organized counties in the state.  During each of the following decennial periods up to 1851, new counties were created to the current number of 88.  Where portions of the new counties came from two or more congressional districts, the voters continued to cast their ballots for representative in Congress as in the original district until the next apportionment was made.

Territorial representation — 1799 to 1802

During the Fifth, Sixth and Seventh Congresses, the Northwest Territory was represented by one at-large Territorial Delegate.  These were in turn William Henry Harrison, who resigned to become governor of Indiana Territory, William McMillan, and Paul Fearing.

Statehood representation — 1803 to 1812
Ohio entered the Union on February 19, 1803 a few weeks before the end of the Seventh Congress. From 1803 to 1812, the entire state constituted a single representative district in Congress, held by Jeremiah Morrow for all five terms.  In the Seventh Congress Ohio had a population of 47,500; in the Eighth, when the state was first fully represented, the population was 68,850; in the Ninth the population numbered 91,280; in the Tenth it rose to 150,965, and in the Eleventh it reached 250,325, so that the member from Ohio not only represented the largest geographical territory of any single congressman, but about three times as large a constituency as any other.

First apportionment — 1812 to 1822
The state was first apportioned into representative districts by the Act of January 14, 1812, six districts being designated.

Based on the Third Federal Census, the state was entitled to seven representatives in Congress, but this fact was overlooked at the time the apportionment was made.  No attempt was made to rectify this error, the result being that Ohio was short five congressional seats during the decade, and one elector at each of the presidential elections in 1812, 1816 and 1820.

Second apportionment — 1822 to 1832
The second apportionment was made on 22 May 1822.  The official report of the Fourth Federal Census not having been received in time for consideration and action at the regular session, the state legislature was assembled in extraordinary session for that purpose.  The state then contained 66 organized counties, and was divided into 14 districts.

Third apportionment — 1832 to 1842
On 4 June 1832, the legislature convened in extraordinary session for the second time for the purpose of apportioning the state into congressional districts and continued in session 10 days to complete the apportionment.

There were 74 organized counties and they were divided into 19 districts based on the Fifth Federal Census.

Fourth apportionment — 1842 to 1845
The fourth apportionment for Congress was made at the fourth extraordinary session of the legislature, convened for the purpose on 25 July 1842. The legislature in 1842 contained a Democratic majority and the apportionment debate acrimonious, the Whigs denouncing the proposed redistricting as unfair and grossly partisan. Consequently, the session ran until August 12.

This adjustment of the congressional districts subsequently became the excuse for a number of the most notorious gerrymanders at the hands of the leaders of both parties in later years.

There were 78 organized counties, which were divided into 21 districts based on the Sixth Federal Census.

Fifth apportionment — 1845 to 1852
The legislature in 1842 had a Democratic majority and the apportionment had been denounced by the Whigs as unfair and grossly partisan.  In 1844–1845, control of the legislature was in Whig hands.  On 12 March 1845, the Whigs proceeded to readjust the congressional districts, the first use of the implied legislative power to redistrict at any time, not bound strictly to the federal census. The legislature added one county to the list of those already organized.

Sixth apportionment — 1852 to 1862
On the 11 March 1851, the eighty-eighth county was organized; no additional county has been created since then. The legislature of 1852–1853, the first elected under the new Ohio constitution, was Democratic and apportioned the state into 21 congressional districts under the Seventh Federal Census.

Seventh apportionment — 1862 to 1872
The legislature elected in 1861 and serving during 1862 and 1863 was controlled by the Republican Party. The United States Congress had just passed an act increasing the ratio of representation, and this had the effect of reducing the number of Ohio representatives in Congress from 21 to 19, and in the rest of the Union proportionately. During the first session of the Fifty-fifth general assembly, in 1862, the state was apportioned into the 19 districts based on the Eighth Federal Census.

Eighth apportionment — 1872 to 1878
In the seventh decennial period, Ohio regained a congressman and was entitled to 20 representatives. The legislature chosen in 1871, and sitting in 1872–1873 was controlled by the Republican Party, and during the session of 1872 apportioned the state into twenty districts based on the Ninth Federal Census.

Ninth apportionment — 1878 to 1880
The Sixty-third general assembly, elected in 1877, was controlled by the Democratic Party, and following the precedent of the Whig legislature of 1845, at its session in 1878 it revised and recast the representative districts.

The result of this readjustment of the districts was seen at the ensuing election. At the election in 1878, the head of the Republican state ticket received 274,120 votes, and the head of the Democratic ticket received 270,966 votes.  Each party won ten seats.  In contrast, using the earlier districting two years before in 1876, the heads of the tickets were similarly balanced (Republican 317,856, Democratic 311,220), yet voters elected 13 Republican congressmen and 7 Democrats.

Tenth apportionment — 1880 to 1882
A Republican legislature was elected in 1879, and sat in 1880–1881. It proceeded at its first session to redistrict the state, and its effect upon the political campaign of the congressional delegation was pronounced. The vote for the head of the ticket was: Republican, 362,021; Democratic, 343,016. Instead of 10 members to each of the parties as in the election of 1878, the Republicans secured 14 and the Democrats 6.

Eleventh apportionment — 1882 to 1884
With the beginning of the eighth decennial period, Ohio was entitled to an additional representative in congress following the Tenth Federal Census, and there were 21 districts to be created. The legislature elected in 1882, and which met in 1883, was controlled by the Republican Party.

Twelfth apportionment — 1884 to 1886
The Sixty-sixth general assembly, 1884–1885, elected in 1883, was Democratic. However, reapportionment by the Democrats in 1884 did not work to their benefit politically. Under the Republican apportionment of 1882, 12 Democrats were elected as Congressmen to 5 for the Republicans. After the twelfth apportionment in 1884, the seats held stood Democrats 10, Republicans 11 even though the head of the Democratic state ticket received 316,874 votes to the Republicans 297,759. In 1884, the head of the Republican state ticket had received 391,597 and the Democratic ticket 380,355. There may have been local factors in 1884.

Thirteenth apportionment — 1886 to 1890
The Republicans controlled the legislature elected in 1885, and revised the Democratic apportionment of 1884 as soon as the general assembly organized in 1885. At the congressional election in 1886, under this apportionment voters elected 15 Republicans congressmen and 6  Democrats, as against 11 Republicans and 10 Democrats two years previously, even though the vote for the head of the Republican ticket in 1886 was 341,095 and for the head of the Democratic ticket, 329,314.

Fourteenth apportionment — 1890 to 1892
In 1889 the Democrats elected a majority of the legislature, which met in 1890, and revised and reapportioned the state. Under this apportionment, voters elected 14 Democratic congressmen and 7 Republicans in 1890, when the vote for the respective heads of the Republican and Democratic state tickets stood: Republican, 363,584; Democratic, 352,579.

Fifteenth apportionment — 1892 to 1902
The regular decennial apportionment under the Eleventh Federal Census was due to be made in 1892. The Republicans were again in control but in 1892 succeeded only in winning 9 seats, while the Democrats won 12. At the subsequent elections, however, the Republicans succeeded in increasing their delegation to as high as 15.

Between 1892 and 1900, there were no revisions of the apportionment only because the Democrats did not secure control of the legislature.

See also
 United States congressional apportionment
 Redistricting
 Ohio Apportionment Board

References
 Taylor, William A.  Ohio In Congress From 1803 To 1901.  Columbus, Ohio: The XX. Century Publishing Co., 1900 (Copyright 1899).

Congressional districts of Ohio
Ohio
19th century in Ohio
19th century in politics